Isan Xavier Díaz (born May 27, 1996) is a Puerto Rican professional baseball second baseman for the San Francisco Giants of Major League Baseball (MLB). The Arizona Diamondbacks selected Díaz in the second round of the 2014 Major League Baseball draft. He was the 2015 Pioneer League MVP. He made his MLB debut in 2019.

Early life
Díaz is originally from Puerto Rico, but his family moved to Springfield, Massachusetts when he was four years old. His father, Raul, played college baseball and instructed Isan as a child.

Díaz attended Springfield Central High School in Springfield. He committed to attend Vanderbilt University to play college baseball for the Vanderbilt Commodores.

Professional career

Arizona Diamondbacks
The Arizona Diamondbacks selected Díaz in the second round, with the 70th overall selection, of the 2014 Major League Baseball draft. Díaz signed with the Diamondbacks for a signing bonus of $750,000, rather than enroll at Vanderbilt. They assigned him to the Arizona League Diamondbacks in the Rookie-level Arizona League, where he posted a .187 average with three home runs and 21 RBIs in 49 games.

In 2015, Díaz played for the Missoula Osprey of the Rookie-level Pioneer League. He was named the Diamondbacks' Minor League Player of the Month for July, a mid-season and post-season Pioneer League All Star, and Most Valuable Player of the Pioneer League at the end of the season after leading the league with 25 doubles and  batting .360(8th in the league)/.436(7th)/.640(2nd) in 272 at bats with 58 runs (2nd), 6 triple (5th), 13 home runs (2nd), 51 RBIs (3rd), 12 stolen bases, 34 walks (7th), and a 1.076 OPS (2nd) in 68 games. MiLB.com named Diaz the Diamondbacks' Organization All-Star at shortstop, and Baseball America named him a Rookie All Star.

Milwaukee Brewers
On January 30, 2016, the Diamondbacks traded Díaz to the Milwaukee Brewers along with Chase Anderson, Aaron Hill, and cash considerations for Jean Segura and Tyler Wagner. Díaz spent the 2016 season with the Wisconsin Timber Rattlers of the Class A Midwest League, where he hit .264 with a career high 20 home runs and 75 RBIs in 135 games. He won the Brewers' organization's Minor League Player of the Year Award. He was also selected to play in the Arizona Fall League.

Díaz spent the 2017 season playing for the Carolina Mudcats of the Class A-Advanced Carolina League where he struggled, batting only .222 with 13 home runs and 54 RBIs in 110 games.

Miami Marlins

On January 25, 2018, the Brewers traded Díaz to the Miami Marlins, along with Lewis Brinson, Monte Harrison and Jordan Yamamoto in exchange for Christian Yelich. MLB.com ranked him as Miami's eighth best prospect going into the 2018 season. Diaz began the season with Jacksonville Jumbo Shrimp of the Class AA Southern League and was promoted to the New Orleans Baby Cakes of the Class AAA Pacific Coast League in July. In 119 games between the two teams, he slashed .232/.340/.399 with 13 home runs, 56 RBIs, and 14 stolen bases.

The Marlins added Díaz to their 40-man roster after the 2018 season. He opened the 2019 season back with New Orleans. He set a franchise record by hitting home runs in five consecutive games in May 2019. Díaz was named to the 2019 All-Star Futures Game. Over 102 games with New Orleans, he batted .305/.395/.578 with 89 runs (8th in the PCL), 26 home runs and 70 RBIs, while playing second base.

The Marlins promoted Díaz to the major leagues on August 5, 2019. He made his major league debut and recorded his first major league hit and RBI that same day when he hit a home run off New York Mets pitcher Jacob deGrom. In 49 games with Miami, he batted .173 with five home runs and 23 RBIs. 

After playing two games in the 2020 season, Díaz opted out of the remainder of the season due to the Marlins' COVID-19 outbreak. However, Díaz reversed his decision to opt-out of the season in September and was cleared to rejoin the Marlins. After five games in the month of September, Díaz suffered a left groin strain and was placed on the 60-day injured list.

Díaz began the 2021 MLB season at the Marlins alternative training site after losing the starting second baseman role to Jazz Chisholm. On April 28, 2021, Díaz was recalled from the alternate training site. Díaz hit his first career grand slam on May 8, 2021 off Milwaukee Brewers reliever Patrick Weigel. 

He was designated for assignment on March 22, 2022. He cleared waivers and was outrighted to the minor leagues on March 29, 2022.

San Francisco Giants
On April 30, 2022, the Marlins traded Diaz to the San Francisco Giants for a player to be named later or cash considerations.

In 2022 with the Triple-A Sacramento River Cats, he batted .275/.377/.574 in 284 at bats, with 23 home runs (9th in the Pacific Coast League) and 61 RBIs. He played 57 games at second base, 14 at shortstop, 10 at third base, and six at DH.

Díaz was optioned to Triple-A Sacramento to begin the 2023 season.

References

External links

1996 births
Living people
Sportspeople from Bayamón, Puerto Rico
Major League Baseball players from Puerto Rico
Major League Baseball infielders
Miami Marlins players
Arizona League Diamondbacks players
Gigantes de Carolina players
Missoula Osprey players
Wisconsin Timber Rattlers players
Salt River Rafters players
Carolina Mudcats players
Jacksonville Jumbo Shrimp players
New Orleans Baby Cakes players